Gerald Mulcahy (1934 – 9 November 1994) was an Irish hurler who played at club level with Glen Rovers and at inter-county level with the Cork senior hurling team. He usually lined out as a defender.

Career

Mulcahy first came to prominence as a hurler with the Glen Rovers club on Cork's northside. He was only 16-years-old when he won a Cork JHC title in 1950. He later won a Cork SHC title with the senior team in 1959, having already won a Cork SFC with sister club St. Nicholas' in 1954. Mulcahy was a dual player when he first appeared on the inter-county scene at minor level. He was a reserve when Cork won the All-Ireland MHC in 1951 before winning a Munster MFC title in 1952. Mulcahy won an All-Ireland JHC title in 1955 and was one of seven players who made their senior team debut when Cork were beaten by Waterford in the 1959 Munster final.

Personal life and death

Mulcahy died suddenly at the Mercy Hospital on 9 November 1994. His son, Tomás Mulcahy, captained Cork to victory in the 1990 All-Ireland final.

Honours

St. Nicholas'
Cork Senior Football Championship: 1954

Glen Rovers
Cork Senior Hurling Championship: 1959

Cork
All-Ireland Junior Hurling Championship: 1955
Munster Junior Hurling Championship: 1955
All-Ireland Minor Hurling Championship: 1951
Munster Minor Hurling Championship: 1951
Munster Minor Football Championship: 1952

References

1934 births
1994 deaths
Cork inter-county hurlers
Cork inter-county Gaelic footballers
Dual players
Glen Rovers hurlers
St Nicholas' Gaelic footballers